This is a list of natural monuments of Turkey. As of July 1, 2015, there are 112 natural monuments comprising caves, landforms, waterfalls and mostly old trees (Tree). These protected natural or cultural features of outstanding or unique value are administered by the Directorate-General of Nature Protection and National Parks of the Ministry of Environment and Forest.

References

Natural monuments